The Greatest Hits – Why Try Harder is a compilation album by English electronic musician Fatboy Slim, released on 19 June 2006. In addition to previously released material, the album includes two new tracks: "Champion Sound" and "That Old Pair of Jeans". A collection of music videos titled The Greatest Hits – Why Make Videos was also released in 2006. Hit singles Ya Mama and Star 69 were omitted.

Background
To save space on the audio disc, the songs are shorter radio edits with the exception of the final track. The profanity in "Wonderful Night" remains intact in the United Kingdom edition, but was removed for the United States. "Champion Sound" is also significantly different on the US edition, as it contains verses that are absent from the UK release.

Cover art
For the UK release, the artwork for the album cover was created by Brighton artist Julie-Anne Gilburt. It features the image of the man previously used on the cover of You've Come a Long Way, Baby. Gilburt painted this cover for the greatest hits album depicting an angelic version of the man, with wings. Several images were created for this project, including a full frontal nude, and the man lounging on a sofa. These images appear in the album booklet.

For the US release, the front cover was altered to that of Christopher Walken from the "Weapon of Choice" music video. The title of the compilation comes from the slogan on the T-shirt of the man who adorns the non-US covers of both this album and You've Come a Long Way, Baby: "I'M # 1 SO WHY TRY HARDER".

Track listing

The Greatest Hits – Why Make Videos DVD
 "Praise You"
 "The Rockafeller Skank"
 "Weapon of Choice" (starring Christopher Walken)
 "Gangster Trippin'"
 "Wonderful Night"
 "Right Here, Right Now"
 "Going Out of My Head"
 "Sunset (Bird of Prey)"
 "Everybody Loves a Carnival"
 "Don't Let the Man Get You Down" (swimming ending)
 "Demons"
 "Slash Dot Dash"
 "Santa Cruz"
 "Ya Mama"
 "Star 69"
 "The Joker"
 "That Old Pair of Jeans"

Rare and Unseen Videos

 "Sunset (Bird of Prey)" (directors cut)
 "Star 69" (animated version)
 "Everybody Needs a 303" (Pigboy)
 "The Rockafeller Skank" (Spike Jonze audition demo version)
 "Build It Up, Tear It Down"

 Why Make Videos (documentary)

Special bonus section
 "Are We Having Fun Yet?" (Live from Brighton, Brazil & Brixton) (montage with album version of Love Island put underneath)

Charts

Weekly charts

Year-end charts

Certifications

References

External links
 
 

2006 greatest hits albums
2006 video albums
Fatboy Slim compilation albums
Astralwerks compilation albums
Astralwerks video albums
Skint Records albums
Music video compilation albums